Cliff Pace (born May 23, 1980) often called “Game Face Pace”, is a professional bass fisherman from Petal, Mississippi. Pace is the 43rd world champion of bass fishing and the 39th member of the B.A.S.S. Millionaires Club. Pace has predominantly fished the Bass Anglers Sportsman Society (BASS) Bassmasters tournament series during his career but now competes in the Major League Fishing Bass Pro Tour.

Biography
Cliff Pace was born in Petal, Mississippi. He has competed in 100 tournaments, and had three first-place finishes and twenty-five top ten finishes.

He resides in Petal, Mississippi and has a daughter, Jordan Baylee.

Career Stats
Tournaments Entered: 155
Winnings: $1,762,740.00
Wins: 4
Top 10s: 31
Top 20s: 48 
Money finishes: 78
Classic Appearance: 8

Awards
2013 Bassmaster Classic Champion

2019 MLF Bass Pro Tour Stage Eight in Neenah, WI.

See also
 Angling
 Bass fishing
 Bassmaster Classic
 Fishing tournament

References

External links
 Bassmaster Home Page
 Bassmaster Angler's Profile: Cliff Pace
 Bass Fan Angler's Profile: Cliff Pace
https://majorleaguefishing.com/angler/cliff-pace/

1980 births
Living people
Sportspeople from Mississippi
American fishers
People from Petal, Mississippi